Ibn Zamrak (also Zumruk) or  Abu Abduallah Muhammad ibn Yusuf ibn Muhammad ibn Ahmad ibn Muhammad ibn Yusuf al-Surayhi, (1333–1393) was an Arab Andalusian poet and statesman from Granada, Al-Andalus. Some his poems still decorate the fountains and palaces of Alhambra in Granada.

He was of humble origin but thanks to his teacher Ibn al-Khatib he was introduced at the court of the Nasrids. He accompanied Sultan Abu Abd Allah Mohammed V to Morocco and when Mohammed was reinstated on the throne in Granada in 1361 he was appointed as his private secretary and a court poet. When Ibn al-Khatib was dismissed as vizier in 1371, Ibn Zamrak succeeded him and hired a group of assassins to kill him in prison after his arrest in Fez. Later, Ibn Zamrak himself was imprisoned for nearly two years by Yusuf II and was assassinated on the orders of Sultan Muhammad VII while he was reading the Qur'an at home in 1393.

See also
Court of the Lions

Sources

 "Biography of Ibn Zamrak", in: The Encyclopaedia of Islam.(2), iii, pp. 972–973, article by F. de la Granja
 "The Eye of Sovereignty: Poetry and Vision in the Alhambra's Lindaraja Mirado" by D. Fairchild Ruggles, in: Gesta, Vol. 36, No. 2, Visual Culture of Medieval Iberia (1997), pp. 180–189
 García Gómez, Emilio (1905-1995), Ibn Zamrak el poeta de la Alhambra, Granada : Patronato de la Alhambra, 1975
 Le poete vizir Ibn Zamrak: du faubourg d' Al baycine au palais de l'Alhambra, by Hamdan Hadjadji, 2005 
 Ibn Zamrak al-Gharnāṭī, 733-796 H/1333-1393 M : sīratuhu wa-adabuh, by Aḥmad Salīm Ḥimṣī, Bayrūt : Mu'assasat al-Risālah ; Ṭarābulus, Lubnān : Där al-Īmān, 1985.

External links
 Poems of the Alhambra 

1333 births
1393 deaths
14th-century Arabs
Poets from al-Andalus